"Outlawed" is a comic book storyline published by Marvel Comics starting with the one-shot issue Outlawed on March 18, 2020. This new event for Marvel's young heroes is set after the events of the one-shot issue Incoming!

Because of the COVID-19 pandemic, the physical comics for this storyline were not published. Instead, the tie-in issues were released digitally starting on May 13, 2020, while the main storyline was released starting on October 7, 2020.

The final conclusion of this storyline ends in its follow-up, titled "Killer App".

Plot

Beginning: Incoming!
Brawn is visiting his Champions teammates at Champions Mobile Bunker as Ms. Marvel announces the movie night. While arguing over what movie to watch, they hear the news Senator Geoffrey Patrick from Indiana talking about Brawn, his rampage in New York, and remarks of how he is not the first young hero to endanger the public. Meanwhile, at the Brooklyn Bridge, a semi-truck is smashed through the bridge's wires. Spider-Man (Miles Morales) and Spider-Man (Peter Parker) arrive and save the truck. Later, Peter and Miles are hanging out where Miles remarks on Senator Patrick's recent crusade on young heroes. Peter confides about being a menace as it is similar to his past interactions with J. Jonah Jameson.

The Champions are monitoring a teen summit at Coles Academic High School to protect Ailana Kabua, who has been targeted by Roxxon. The school is attacked by Roxxon using an Asgardian dragon left from the War of the Realms. The Champions brawl against Roxxon while also evacuating the crowd. Power Man sends his chi-force at the dragon but Viv is accidentally hit and becomes unstable. The Champions are unable to keep the high school from being destroyed as they attack and manage to stop both the dragon and Viv, who disappears. Meanwhile, escorting Ailana to safety, Ms. Marvel saves her from falling debris by risking her life. Ironheart breaks down in the aftermath of the chaos. Due to the Coles Disaster, the Underage Superhuman Welfare Act is passed by Senator Patrick outlawing superheroes under the age of 21, despite Avengers defending the Champions' actions. Ms. Marvel is in a coma in a hospital and to honor her, the act is named "Kamala's Law", without knowing her secret identity as Ms. Marvel. C.R.A.D.L.E. (Child-Hero Reconnaissance And Disruption Law Enforcement) is created consisting of Dum Dum Dugan, Carolina Washington, Jake Oh, Justice, Speedball, and Timeslip. C.R.A.D.L.E. goes after superheroes like Moon Girl at her home and Ironheart at her Chicago lab and observe the first wave of protest while preparing to raid the West Coast Avengers' HQ. They commandeer the Champions Mobile Bunker while arresting Snowguard and Locust, and hang wanted posters of Ms. Marvel in Jersey City.

Main plot
After waking from a coma, Ms. Marvel makes an unexpected and emotional announcement that her team won't go down without a fight. Spider-Man escapes from getting arrested by the NYPD who is in the turf war with C.R.A.D.L.E. He reaches the abandoned warehouse where the Champions, Cloud 9, Energizer, Mass Master, Moon Girl, Squirrel Girl and Vulture's granddaughter Starling have gathered to plan their next move with video conferencing with Ms. Marvel who is still in the hospital. Ironheart is not present while Falcon has signed up with Sam Wilson to be mentored. They agree to go against the government for their rights but a dispute emerges between Nova and Starling when some heroes disagree with Ms. Marvel's leadership as she announced the war without consulting them and she should have stopped Viv from making rampage. Suddenly, C.R.A.D.L.E. led by Justice ambushes them. Justice tries to explain them the dangers of being young superheroes, but a brawl breaks between them. Ms. Marvel is forced to end the conference realizing there is a spy among them. Bombshell and Wasp are arrested while others are teleported to a safe place by Pinpoint including reluctant Nova. Unbeknownst to others, Viv is the spy who had sent encrypted message to C.R.A.D.L.E.

Bombshell, Locust, Snowguard, and Starling are being forced into Re-education Center for brainwashing by C.R.A.D.L.E. Snowguard and Bombshell managed to free themselves using their powers, but are again captured by time-traveling Timeslip. Protests erupt across Chicago where the Champions members Ms. Marvel, Nova, and Spider-Man are monitoring the crowd. They call Ironheart and receive no response. When C.R.A.D.L.E. and the police start arresting protesters, the Champions rescue them by fighting publicly. Later, they find Ironheart in her public identity at her house where they confronted each other. Ms. Marvel suspects her to be a spy. Riri is furious with Ms. Marvel for not being there and still held herself responsible for Viv's presumed death but transforms into Ironheart when they are attacked by C.R.A.D.L.E. Elsewhere, Viv is on run and prays for the Champions to stop fighting C.R.A.D.L.E. and be safe.

At a Re-education Center, Bombshell gives an interview feeling guilty for Coles Disaster which caused a skirmish between C.R.A.D.L.E. and her teammates as they didn't want to be brainwashed like her. Bombshell's interview becomes breaking news. Somewhere in Kansas, Viv helps an old woman who gives her a place to stay as she correctly guessed her as a runaway. Meanwhile, Ironheart, Ms. Marvel, Nova, and Spider-Man are still on run from C.R.A.D.L.E. who somehow always evade them. They tried to get the help of the Avengers and Brawn, but fail. They are saved by Dust, Pixie and Cyclops, who came to rescue them during the ambush with C.R.A.D.L.E. one night. Cyclops offers them asylum on Krakoa and suggests to the C.R.A.D.L.E. agents to stop unless they want war with the mutant nation.

Pixie teleported the remaining Champions, Cyclops, and Dust at Ironheart's now abandoned lab instead of Krakoa, where Cyclops, Dust, and Pixie reveal that not only Viv Vision is alive, but also betray them to C.R.A.D.L.E. possibly out of guilt for the Kamala's Law happening. The two X-Men also explain to their former teammates why they lied to C.R.A.D.L.E. about the latter team's current whereabouts, due to Krakoa being a mutant-only zone, based on its rules. However, Cyclops provides the Champions a temporary safe haven outside America, at mutants’ pirate ship Marauder, provided by Captain Red Queen, Storm, Bishop, Pyro and Iceman. After getting honorary status Cyclops returns to Krakoa while Champions help the X-Men's Marauder crew to fight against Attuma’s army and rescue the civilians on an invaded ship. Meanwhile, Viv is watching her former teammates fighting crime outside America through satellite projection. The old woman reveals her past life to Viv, and knew her secret identity as a Champion all along, encouraging her to redeem her to repeal the current unjust law she is in and return to her old team for forgiveness.

Viv contacts Brawn first and locates where C.R.A.D.L.E. held the captivated young heroes, including many Champions. Once the rescue mission is a success, the young heroes found out that Roxxon had orchestrated the event, having had been manipulating Senator Patrick behind his back and shifting the blame on the team. The Champions eventually reunite at Riri's home in Chicago, while seeking help from Riri's family to repeal the unjust act. Before broadcasting the truth behind Roxxon's shady activities on the opposing young heroes to the public and Senator Patrick, Viv confesses her previous motives to her teammates were meant for their safety, instead of selling their freedoms to Roxxon. Senator Patrick, who now knows Roxxon's horrible activities, is surrounded by its agents to be killed from exposing themselves until the Champions and a group of protesters arrives to rescue him on time. As Roxxon backs down with no chance of winning, the Champions announce to the public that Senator Patrick finally end his partnership with Roxxon and demolish the “Re-education” Center along with C.R.A.D.L.E., now currently re-evaluating Kamala's Law under much more new legalize rules. Sometimes later, the scene ends with revealing Miles and Sam somehow went to internship at Roxxon.

Conclusion: Killer App
While the Champions are now free to return to their crime-fighting careers, Kamala's Law is still intact while still at a minimum level, and Roxxon attempt to launch an app called "Roxx-On" to cover their dubious activities, under the direction of Miriam Blakemoore. Meanwhile, a Champion member Snowguard leads a group of protestors on Roxxon. Much to Riri's dismay, Roxxon hires her worst rival, André Sims, and Ms. Marvel learns that Roxxon uses their app to secretly gather data to ensure Kamala's Law is fully amended, revealing that André is creating Roxxon's Sentinel-like robots, Champerones to capture under-aged lawbreakers. Eventually, the Champions decide to send Miles and Sam to go undercover as interns, before they have no choice to put Kamala in this mission. During a rally speech by both Snowguard, Bombshell, and Falcon to their fellow protestors, the Champions arrive on time to save them from being ambushed by undercover Roxxon and C.R.A.D.L.E., at the same time they discover that Roxxon hired Fizzle's group, the super-powered criminal group who Champions fought yesterday night.

During Kamala's first undercover mission with Miles and Sam, Viv infiltrates Roxxon's secret lab where Champerones are created and sends the data of Roxxon's next plots to Riri. Thankfully, Kamala pretends to have a word with Miriam in private for the upcoming Roxx-On festival to ensure Viv escapes undetected. During Roxx-On festival, the Champions secretly apprehend Fizzle group to ensure Kamala's public speech to expose Roxxon's true motive is a success. Finally, Kamala's Law has been successfully repealed and C.R.A.D.L.E. is disbanded for their attempt at brute force on Kamala earlier. While all of the younger superheroes celebrate their victory at the Champions' bunker, André secretly unleashes his Champerones unauthorized to hunt younger people who broke the now-repealed law. While the Champions evacuate all nearby young civilians from a rampaging Champerones, Miriam stops André from damaging the company's reputation further and arrests him. It is revealed after Miriam shut down the Champerones while André was wearing a helmet that controlled his drones, it left the right side of his head mutated into a half-cyborg and merge with his helmet's system that allows him to control them.

Issues involved

Prelude one-shot

Main plot

Tie-in issues

On April 15, 2020 Marvel Comics announced that a new version of the New Warriors would appear in the Outlawed storyline, under the mentorship of the original team. The new characters, Trailblazer, Screentime, Snowflake, Safespace and B-Negative, met considerable backlash from the online audience, particularly due to the use of internet slang in their names as well as the perceived political agenda of the writing and designs, with Snowflake and Safespace drawing most of the criticism. Originally delayed by the COVID-19 pandemic as of January 2021, it has yet to be rescheduled for release.

Critical reception 
The story overall received mixed reviews. On Comic Book Round Up, the story received a score of 7.3 out of 10 based on 18 reviews. 

In a review of Outlawed #1, Matt Morrison from Kabooom wrote "Fans of Champions may enjoy this series, but it is hard to recommend it to anyone else. Familiarity with the characters is assumed, so new readers will be left in the dark. The story, while competently executed, is far too derivative of earlier series. And the artwork is merely okay, apart from a few oddly awful panels. Despite this, it's better than Civil War, but that's damning with faint praise." Hannibal Tabu, in his review of the issue for Bleeding Cool, commented that "On a good side, the ability of Eve Ewing to make a compelling script remains untouched. [...] The artwork from Jacknto, Grrundetjern and Cowles likewise takes make dynamic choices in presenting this tragedy. Here's the thing … there is a long history of legislative efforts to rein in metahumans [...]. Taking a tragedy this close to the actual failings in our world while many of us are cloistered behind locked doors, others are forced into potentially virally lethal streets and others laugh in the face of it … it's not exactly entertainment, and maybe not what we need right now".

Kevin Erdmann, for Screen Rant, stated that unlike the first Civil War event, "the Champions end up creating a very satisfying ending". Erdmann highlighted that "not only does Viv Vision confess to her teammates and take responsibility for her actions in Outlawed's inciting incident, but the Champions also discover that the corrupt company Roxxon is under contract with the U.S government, and that they are the ones responsible for the cruel 'reeducation camps' the public has had no idea about. [...] However, the story doesn't end by simply making Roxxon the villains. The Champions equally recognize that they need to hold themselves more accountable for their actions, and need to be better in the future for their own safety as well as for others". Erdmann commented that the resolution is "much more satisfying" than Civil War's because the various characters accept responsibility and are able to come to a compromise with Senator Patrick.

Collected editions

References

External links
 Outlawed at Marvel Wiki

2020 comics debuts
Marvel Comics titles
Comic book reboots
Comic books suspended due to the COVID-19 pandemic